The Northern Hawks are a Rugby League football club that was founded in 2021 after Nelson Bay Sharks Rugby League Football Club combined with Newcastle Hawks. The Sharks had their origins from the Nelson Bay Blues, formed in 1911, as well as the Northern Blues and North-Nelson Bay Marlins (successors to Northern Suburbs). The Northern Hawks currently play in the Newcastle Rugby League First Grade competition, having won the Reserve Grade premiership in 2022.

See also

References

External links
 Official Club Facebook page: https://www.facebook.com/northernhawksrl/

Rugby clubs established in 1911
1911 establishments in Australia
Rugby league teams in Newcastle, New South Wales